Christopher Kealoha Naeole (born December 25, 1974) is a former American football coach and player. He played college football as an offensive guard for the University of Colorado, where he was recognized as an All-American in 1996 and was drafted tenth overall by the New Orleans Saints in the 1997 NFL Draft. Naeole also played for the Jacksonville Jaguars prior to becoming a high school football coach by 2010, later serving as the offensive line coach for the Hawaii Rainbow Warriors.

Early years
Naeole was born in Kailua, Hawaii.  He attended Kahuku High School in Kahuku, Hawaii, and earned two letters in football and one in wrestling.  In football, he was a high school All-America first-team selection by Prep Football Report, and received second-team accolades from Blue Chip Report and an honorable mention from USA Today as a senior.  As a two-way tackle, he made 56 tackles, five sacks, eight passes deflected, four forced fumbles and three fumble recoveries as a senior.

College career
Naeole attended the University of Colorado-Boulder, where he was a three-year starter for the Colorado Buffaloes football team at right guard.  In three seasons, he allowed only one sack.  As a senior in 1996, he was recognized as a consensus first-team All-American and was an All-Big 12 Conference first-team selection.  Naeole was the recipient of the John Mack Award, given to the team's Most Outstanding Offensive Player.  He graduated from the university with a degree in sociology.

Professional career

1997 NFL Draft
Naeole was drafted tenth overall in the 1997 NFL Draft by the New Orleans Saints. He was the highest selected guard since Eric Moore in 1988, and the first Colorado offensive lineman selected in the first round since Stan Brock was drafted by the Saints in 1980.

New Orleans Saints
On July 17, 1997, Naeole signed a five-year, $8 million deal with the New Orleans Saints, and soon afterwards bought a 4,000-square-foot house in Metairie, Louisiana. He played for the team through 2001, and was a starter throughout his time with the Saints.

Jacksonville Jaguars
Naeole was signed by the Jacksonville Jaguars as an unrestricted free agent in 2002. In Week 8 of the 2007 season he suffered a torn quadriceps tendon and was placed on injured reserve. Until this injury, Naeole had missed only one game in his 11 years as a pro, and had started 150 of 154 games in his pro career.

On March 3, 2008, Naeole was released by the Jaguars. He was re-signed on September 17 but did not play again. Naeole later indicated in 2010 that he had retired from professional football.

Coaching career
Naeole was hired as an assistant football coach for Iolani School in Honolulu. He began his duties in the 2010 season. After three years with 'Iolani, Naeole was named the offensive line coach for the Hawaii Warriors. On November 1, 2015, Naeole was named Hawaii's interim head coach following the firing of Norm Chow and finished the season with a 1–3 record.

Naeole was retained as offensive line coach by new Hawaii head coach Nick Rolovich. On October 6, 2017, Naeole resigned, due to what he called "philosophical differences with the handling of disciplinary matters in the program."

Head coaching record

Notes

References

External links
 Hawaii profile
 Jacksonville Jaguars profile

1974 births
Living people
All-American college football players
American football offensive guards
Colorado Buffaloes football players
Hawaii Rainbow Warriors football coaches
Jacksonville Jaguars players
New Orleans Saints players
High school football coaches in Hawaii
People from Laie
Players of American football from Hawaii